Jack Stephens Center is a 5,600-seat multi-purpose arena on the campus of the University of Arkansas at Little Rock in Little Rock, Arkansas, United States and was built in 2005.  It is home to the school's men's basketball, women's basketball, men's wrestling, and women's volleyball teams, known as the Little Rock Trojans, and named in honor of billionaire philanthropist Jackson T. Stephens, who donated $22.4 million for the construction of the facility. The facility is located on the north end of the University of Arkansas at Little Rock campus, adjacent to the University of Arkansas System Division of Agriculture Cooperative Extension Service State Office.

It features a full court practice gymnasium, named in honor of former Trojans basketball star Derek Fisher, academic support spaces, a weight room, and training rooms.

The Trojans had previously played in Barton Coliseum, Verizon Arena and the Statehouse Convention Center.

See also

Barton Coliseum
War Memorial Stadium
List of NCAA Division I basketball arenas

References

External links
 Jack Stephens Center - UALRTrojans.com

Little Rock Trojans men's basketball
Little Rock Trojans women's basketball
College basketball venues in the United States
Sports in Little Rock, Arkansas
Basketball venues in Arkansas
Buildings and structures in Little Rock, Arkansas
Tourist attractions in Little Rock, Arkansas
2005 establishments in Arkansas
Sports venues completed in 2005